Multidentorhodacarus thysi is a species of mite in the family Rhodacaridae.

This species was formerly a member of the genus Rhodacarus.

References

Rhodacaridae
Articles created by Qbugbot
Animals described in 1988